Letícia Izidoro Lima da Silva (born 13 August 1994), commonly known as Letícia or Lelê, is a Brazilian professional football goalkeeper for Brazilian club Corinthians and the Brazilian national team. She was part of the Brazil squad at the 2015 FIFA Women's World Cup.

Club career 

A draft in February 2016 assigned Brazil women's national football team players Letícia and Rafinha to a combined Corinthians Audax team, who went on to win the 2016 Copa do Brasil de Futebol Feminino.

In October 2017 Corinthians Audax won the 2017 Copa Libertadores Femenina. Letícia made two saves in a penalty shootout win over Colo-Colo following a 0–0 draw in the final at Estadio Arsenio Erico, Asunción.

International career
Letícia represented Brazil's youth team at the 2010 FIFA U-17 Women's World Cup in Trinidad and Tobago. After graduating to the under-20 team, she attended the FIFA U-20 Women's World Cup in 2012 and 2014.

In December 2015, she won a cap for the senior Brazil women's national football team at the 2015 International Women's Football Tournament of Natal, appearing as a substitute for Bárbara in an 11–0 win over Trinidad and Tobago.

Honours
Benfica
 Campeonato Nacional Feminino: 2020–21
 Taça da Liga: 2020–21

References

External links

1994 births
Living people
Brazilian women's footballers
Brazil women's international footballers
2015 FIFA Women's World Cup players
Women's association football goalkeepers
Sport Club Corinthians Paulista (women) players
São José Esporte Clube (women) players
Associação Desportiva Centro Olímpico players
2019 FIFA Women's World Cup players
Sociedade Esportiva Kindermann players
Footballers at the 2020 Summer Olympics
Olympic footballers of Brazil
S.L. Benfica (women) footballers
Associação Acadêmica e Desportiva Vitória das Tabocas players